Don't Get Mad Get Even is a Nigerian movie produced in 2019 by Raphael Dedenuola and directed by Wale Ojo. It was released under the production company of RGD Media and distributed by Silver Bird Film Distribution. The movie gives clarity on the difference between education and wealth, it was starred by Femi Jacobs, Yemi Solade, Deyemi Okanlanwon, Kenneth Okolie, Toyin Abraham, Patience Ozokwor and Jide Kosoko

Synopsis 
The Story revolves around two brothers; the educated one and the uneducated but creative one. The movie takes a new face when the brother, who is a lecturer got broke and had to depend on the his younger brother who is now a successful musician.

Premiere 
The movie was premiered in Nigeria and Ghana on the 4th of October 2019.

Cast 

 Femi Jacobs, 
 Deyemi Okanlawon, 
 Toyin Abraham, 
 Patience Ozokwor, 
 Yemi Solade, 
 Nancy Isime, 
 Jide Kosoko,
 Kenneth Okolie and 
 Saheed Balogun

References 

2019 films
English-language Nigerian films
Nigerian drama films